"Three Card Trick" is the first episode of the BBC Two series Wolf Hall. It was first broadcast on 21 January 2015.

Plot
In 1529, King Henry VIII dismisses Lord Chancellor Cardinal Thomas Wolsey for his failure to have the Pope annul Henry's marriage to his wife, Catherine of Aragon, in order to marry Anne Boleyn. Wolsey's lawyer, Thomas Cromwell, reminisces over his time with the Cardinal, his dealings with the Boleyn family and his own personal life, including the death of his wife and two daughters from the sweating sickness in 1528.

Cast

Critical reception
The premiere of Wolf Hall received positive reviews. The Daily Telegraph gave the episode 5/5, saying "it fully communicates the nerve-jangling sense of bodily threat with which Mantel’s novels are freighted — life is cheap in a disease-ridden Tudor England ruled by an absolute monarch."

References

External links
 
 "Three Card Trick" at the BBC

Wolf Hall (miniseries) episodes
2015 British television episodes
Cultural depictions of Henry VIII
Cultural depictions of Anne Boleyn
Fiction set in 1529